The 1996 Russian Second League was the fifth edition of Russian Second Division. There were 3 zones with 60 teams starting the competition (2 were excluded before the end of the season).

Zone West

Overview

Standings

Top goalscorers 

33 goals

  Ibragim Gasanbekov (FC Anzhi Makhachkala)

31 goals

 Vitali Yermilov (FC Torpedo Taganrog)

29 goals

 Sergei Lavrentyev (FC MChS-Selyatino Selyatino)

25 goals

 Igor Lyakhov (FC Metallurg Lipetsk)

23 goals

 Sergei Polstyanov (FC Metallurg Lipetsk)

17 goals

 Vladimir Kharin (FC Lokomotiv Liski)

16 goals

 Aleksandr Zhidkov (FC Metallurg Lipetsk)

15 goals

 Andrei Bakalets (FC MChS-Selyatino Selyatino)

14 goals

 Vladimir Ivanov (FC Gatchina)

13 goals

 Isa Markhiyev (FC Angusht Nazran)

Zone Centre

Overview

Standings

Top goalscorers 

34 goals

 Konstantin Paramonov (FC Amkar Perm)

30 goals

 Valeri Solyanik (FC CSK VVS-Kristall Smolensk)

27 goals

 Aleksandr Kuzmichyov (FC Arsenal Tula)

25 goals

 Aleksei Chernov (FC Lada Dimitrovgrad)

24 goals

 Andrei Knyazev (FC Metallurg Magnitogorsk)

21 goals

 Oleg Nechayev (FC Lada Dimitrovgrad)

20 goals

 Vladimir Pantyushenko (FC Rubin Kazan)

19 goals

 Oleg Sinelobov (FC Nosta Novotroitsk)

17 goals

  Armen Adamyan (FC CSK VVS-Kristall Smolensk)

16 goals

 Igor Palachyov (FC Nosta Novotroitsk)
 Aleksandr Zaikin (FC Lada Dimitrovgrad)

Zone East

Overview

Standings

Top goalscorers 

22 goals

 Marat Mulashev (FC Irtysh Omsk)

18 goals

 Sergei Ageyev (FC Viktoriya Nazarovo)

16 goals

 Anatoli Kisurin (FC Dynamo Omsk)

14 goals

 Sergei Rogalevskiy (FC Kuzbass Kemerovo)

13 goals

 Sergei Shaporenko (FC Irtysh Omsk)

11 goals

 Aleksandr Bogatyryov (FC Viktoriya Nazarovo)
 Yevgeni Savin (FC Dynamo Barnaul)

10 goals

 Maksim Shvetsov (FC SKA Khabarovsk)

9 goals

 Stanislav Achkasov (FC Kuzbass Kemerovo)
 Ruslan Akhidzhak (FC Tom Tomsk)
 Stanislav Chaplygin (FC Metallurg-ZapSib Novokuznetsk)
  Yury Khadaronak (FC Samotlor-XXI Nizhnevartovsk)
 Sergei Kondratskiy (FC Irtysh Omsk)
 Konstantin Orlov (FC Metallurg-ZapSib Novokuznetsk)
 Vitali Razdrogin (FC Irtysh Omsk)
 Viktor Sebelev (FC Tom Tomsk)
 Taras Shulga (FC SKA Khabarovsk)

See also
1996 Russian Top League
1996 Russian First League
1996 Russian Third League

3
1996
Russia
Russia